Nipponomyia is a genus of hairy-eyed craneflies (family Pediciidae).

Distribution
All are from Asia. Most, but not all species are Oriental.

Species
Nipponomyia flavicollis Edwards, 1933
Nipponomyia gracilis Savchenko, 1983
Nipponomyia joshii Alexander, 1957
Nipponomyia kamengensis Alexander, 1967
Nipponomyia khasiana Alexander, 1936
Nipponomyia kulingensis Alexander, 1937
Nipponomyia kuwanai (Alexander, 1913)
Nipponomyia mannheimsiana Alexander, 1969
Nipponomyia nigrocorporis Alexander, 1944
Nipponomyia novempunctata (Senior-White, 1922)
Nipponomyia pentacantha Alexander, 1958
Nipponomyia sumatrana (de Meijere, 1924)
Nipponomyia symphyletes (Alexander, 1923)
Nipponomyia szechwanensis Alexander, 1935
Nipponomyia trispinosa (Alexander, 1920)

References

 

Pediciidae
Tipuloidea genera
Diptera of Asia